Arcens is a commune in the Ardèche department in the Auvergne-Rhône-Alpes region of southern France.

The inhabitants of the commune are known as Arcensois or Arcensoises

Geography
Arcens is located some 55 km east by south-east of Le Puy-en-Velay and 60 km west of Valence. It can be accessed by the D237 road from Saint-Martin-de-Valamas in the north-east passing through the commune and the village and continuing south-west to Saint-Martial. Apart from the village there are also the hamlets of Massas and Les Allayauds in the south-west. The entire commune is heavily forested.

The Eysse river flows through the commune and the village from south-west to north-east gathering numerous tributaries on the way. It forms part of the northern border of the commune before continuing north to join the Eyrieux at Saint-Martin-de-Valamas.

Neighbouring communes and villages

Toponymy
It appears that the origin of the commune name Arcens was from a hamlet in the 14th century and the area occupied by the current commune was divided between three Lords in 1464.

History
Arcens is a village divided between the plateau and the valley and in the Middle Ages was the borders of three lordships (Brion, Chanéac, and Fourchades).
 
The first mention that is often recounted, of Mansus de Arcenno in 1024, does not apply to Arcens, but to a manse near Escoulenc (Saint-Andéol-d'Escoulenc in Erieux).
 
In 1164 Pope Alexander III confirmed the Arcens church to the chapter of Puy but this date is controversial.
 
On 17 April 1195 the next pope, Adrian IV, confirmed the church to the abbey of Saint-Chaffre.
 
In 1620, the Acens church depended on the chapter of Puy whose canons named the priests.
 
The Lordship of Arcens appears only in the 15th century in the Brion family: thence it passed to Crussol and in the 18th century was in the hands of the Aiguillon family, one of the most powerful of the time.
 
The revolutionary period left some traces: the sales of church property, theft from the tax collector, then a strange resignation of the council. The lord of Arcens (de Brion) was meanwhile guillotined.

Administration

List of Successive Mayors

Demography
In 2017 the commune had 376 inhabitants.

Distribution of Age Groups

The population of the commune is older than the departmental average.

Percentage Distribution of Age Groups in Arcens and Ardèche Department in 2017

Source: INSEE

Sites and Monuments

Source of gaseous mineral water.
A Chateau from the 16th century.
A Church from the 19th century.

Notable people linked to the commune
Rémy Roure, resistance fighter, editor-in-chief of Le Monde, founder of the Democratic Party then the UDSR.
Rene Baumer (1906-1982), painter, resistance fighter and deportee. Wrote two novels about Soutron.

See also
Communes of the Ardèche department

References

External links

Arcens official website 
Arcens on the National Geographic Institute website 
Arcens on Géoportail, National Geographic Institute (IGN) website 
Arcens on the 1750 Cassini Map

Communes of Ardèche